"Mr. Dingle, the Strong" is episode 55 of the American television anthology series The Twilight Zone, and is the 19th episode of the second season. It was one of the many episodes in the second season written by series creator and showrunner Rod Serling, and was directed by German filmmaker John Brahm. The episode originally aired on March 3, 1961 on CBS.

Opening narration

The narration continues when the Martians arrive.

Plot
In an experiment, a two-headed Martian scientist, who is invisible to Earthlings, gives vacuum-cleaner salesman and perennial loser Luther Dingle superhuman strength. After discovering his inexplicable powers, Dingle begins performing various feats of strength, from lifting statues to splitting boulders, and gains a great deal of publicity.

The two-headed Martian returns and is disappointed to see that Dingle is using his strength only for show. The Martian takes his strength away just as Dingle attempts to lift a building before a live television audience. Unable to make good on his claims or repeat any of his previous feats, Dingle becomes a laughingstock.

As the two-headed Martian scientist leaves, it meets two Venusians who are also searching for a suitable Earthling for an experiment. The two-headed Martian scientist recommends Dingle and the Venusians gives Dingle super-intelligence. Discovering his new powers, Dingle starts thinking aloud at an alarming rate and demonstrates incredible powers of prediction.

Closing narration

Short story adaptation
In the short story version of this episode, the bettor is named Hubert Kransky and the two-headed Martian is named Xurthya. Dingle also beats up Hubert at one point. Additionally, Dingle takes his brilliance to change the world at Harvard.

See also
 List of The Twilight Zone (1959 TV series) episodes

References
DeVoe, Bill. (2008). Trivia from The Twilight Zone. Albany, GA: Bear Manor Media. 
Grams, Martin. (2008). The Twilight Zone: Unlocking the Door to a Television Classic. Churchville, MD: OTR Publishing.

External links
 

1961 American television episodes
The Twilight Zone (1959 TV series season 2) episodes
Television episodes written by Rod Serling